The Parable of the Two Sons is a parable told by Jesus in the New Testament, found in Matthew. It contrasts the tax collectors and prostitutes who accepted the message taught by John the Baptist with the "religious" people who did not.

Summary 
The parable refers to a certain man who has two sons. He asks them both to work in his vineyard. One of the two said that he wouldn't do the work, but he later changed his mind and he did the work anyways. The other said he would do it, but then he didn't do it like he said he would.

Narrative in Matthew's Gospel
In the Gospel of Matthew, the parable is as follows:

Interpretation
In this parable, Jesus reproved those who considered themselves virtuous; whereas those they considered sinners, such as the tax collectors and prostitutes, were accepting the message of John the Baptist and repenting. The parable of the Pharisee and the Publican has a similar theme.

Cornelius a Lapide, in his great commentary, writes that "this parable scarcely needs an explanation, because Christ applies and explains it. In truth, the first—being at the beginning unwilling to obey his father, but afterwards repenting and obeying, by going to work in the vineyard—denotes the publicans and harlots; who at first by their sins repelled the will and law of God, but afterwards by John’s preaching came to a better mind, and did penance, and lived chastely and justly, according to the law of God. The second son—who said to his father that he would go into the vineyard, but broke his word, and went not—denotes the Scribes and Pharisees; who always had the law of God in their mouths (as though they were most zealous and religious observers of it), but did not fulfil it in their deeds, but by lust, rapine, and usury acted contrary to it. Wherefore they provoked the heavy displeasure and anger of God against them, as well on account of their wickedness itself as because of their hypocrisy and feigned observance of the Law. For such hypocrisy and duplicity grievously provokes God."

References

Gospel of Matthew
John the Baptist
Two Sons, Parable of the